{{DISPLAYTITLE:CH3NO}}
The molecular formula CH3NO (molar mass: 45.04 g/mol, exact mass: 45.0215 u) may refer to:

 Formaldoxime
 Formamide, or methanamide
 
 Oxaziridine